UralVagonZavod is a Russian machine-building company located in Nizhny Tagil, Russia.

It is one of the largest scientific and industrial complexes in Russia and the largest main battle tank manufacturer in the world.

The name Уралвагонзавод means Ural Railroad Car (wagon) Factory.

History 
The plant was built during 1931–1936 (mostly during the second Soviet five-year plan), launched on October 11, 1936, and named after Felix Dzerzhinsky. Initially it manufactured freight cars.

After the German invasion of 1941, Joseph Stalin ordered hundreds of factories in Ukraine and western Russia to be evacuated east. The KhPZ Factory No. 183 in Kharkiv was moved to Nizhny Tagil by rail, and merged with the Dzerzhinsky Works, to form the Stalin Ural Tank Factory No. 183. During the Second World War it became the largest producer of tanks in the world, including the T-34. For its services, Uralvagonzavod received several honorary awards over 1941–1945, including the Order of the Red Banner of Labour (1942), Order of the Red Banner (1943), Order of Lenin (1944), Order of the Patriotic War (1945).

After the war, tank production was scaled down, and part of the Vagonka's manufacturing and design assets were transferred back to Kharkiv's Diesel Factory No. 75 during 1945–1951. Uralvagonzavod was expanded to produce other kinds of machinery: agricultural, construction, aviation, and space, including design and production of the Vostok, Voskhod, Proton and Energia expendable rockets.

It is the location of the Kartsev-Venediktov Design Bureau (OKB-520) where the T-54A and T-55 (development of Morozov's T-54), T-62, T-72, and T-90 tanks have been designed, and was working on one possibility for a next-generation main battle tank, rumored to be called the T-95, until this project was cancelled in May 2010. It also manufactures Russia's newest main battle tank, the T-14 Armata.

As of December 27, 2016, UVZ has been transferred to Rostec, following a presidential decree.

Sanctions
On July 16, 2014, the Obama administration imposed sanctions through the US Department of Treasury's Office of Foreign Assets Control (OFAC) by adding Uralvagonzavod and other entities to the Specially Designated Nationals List (SDN) in retaliation for the ongoing annexation of the Crimean Peninsula by the Russian Federation and the Russian interference in Ukraine.

In 2022, Uralvagonzavod was placed under additional sanctions as a result of the Russian invasion of Ukraine

In March 2022, as a result of the 2022 Russian invasion of Ukraine the EU imposed sanctions on Uralvagonzavod.

Operations
The company's main products include railway cars, tanks, road-building vehicles, agricultural vehicles such as the RT-M-160, metallurgical products, tools and consumer goods.

Production of T-90 main battle tanks accounts for 18–20% of the company's overall production. In 2008, Uralvagozavod produced about 175 tanks, including 62 T-90As for the Russian Ministry of Defense and 60 T-90Ss for India. This represents the highest level of tank production at UralVagonZavod and in Russia as a whole since 1993. Moreover, according to Moscow Defense Brief, it would appear that in 2008 the number of tanks produced by the company was greater than the number of main battle tanks produced by all the other countries of the world taken together.

Railway cars and other civilian production amounted to two-thirds of the company's overall output in 2008.

In 2011, the company's revenue was $3 billion, and net profit was $0.33 billion.

References

Literature

External links

 
Social:

 https://t.me/uvznews (Telgram)
 https://vk.com/realuvznews (VK)
 https://youtube.com/c/uvznews (YouTube)

 
Defence companies of Russia
Defence companies of the Soviet Union
Military vehicle manufacturers
Manufacturing companies established in 1936
1936 establishments in the Soviet Union
Companies based in Sverdlovsk Oblast
Companies formerly listed on the Moscow Exchange
Nizhny Tagil
Rostec
Ministry of the Defense Industry (Soviet Union)
Russian entities subject to the U.S. Department of the Treasury sanctions